These are the official results of the 2009 South American Championships in Athletics which took place on 19–21 June 2009 in Lima, Peru.

Men's results

100 meters

Heats – June 19Wind:Heat 1: -0.4 m/s, Heat 2: +0.3 m/s, Heat 3: -2.4 m/s

Final – June 20Wind:+0.6 m/s

200 meters

Heats – June 20Wind:Heat 1: 0.0 m/s, Heat 2: -0.2 m/s, Heat 3: -0.4 m/s

Final – June 21Wind:0.0 m/s

400 meters

Heats – June 20

Final – June 21

800 meters
June 21

1500 meters
June 19

5000 meters
June 21

10,000 meters
June 20

110 meters hurdles

Heats – June 19Wind:Heat 1: -1.6 m/s, Heat 2: -0.8 m/s

Final – June 20Wind:-0.5 m/s

400 meters hurdles

Heats – June 20

Final – June 21

3000 meters steeplechase
June 20

4 x 100 meters relay
June 20

4 x 400 meters relay
June 21

20,000 meters walk
June 21

High jump
June 20

Pole vault
June 20

Long jump
June 21

Triple jump
June 20

Shot put
June 20

Discus throw
June 21

Hammer throw
June 20

Javelin throw
June 20

Decathlon

Women's results

100 meters

Heats – June 19Wind:Heat 1: -2.0 m/s, Heat 2: -0.2 m/s

Final – June 20Wind:-0.8 m/s

200 meters

Heats – June 20Wind:Heat 1: -0.3 m/s, Heat 2: -0.2 m/s

Final – June 21Wind:-0.0 m/s

400 meters

Heats – June 20

Final – June 21

800 meters
June 21

1500 meters
June 19

5000 meters
June 19

10,000 meters
June 19

100 meters hurdles

Heats – June 19Wind:Heat 1: -0.8 m/s, Heat 2: 0.0 m/s

Final – June 20Wind:-0.2 m/s

400 meters hurdles

Heats – June 20

Final – June 21

3000 meters steeplechase
June 20

4 x 100 meters relay
June 20

4 x 400 meters relay
June 21

20,000 meters walk
June 20

High jump
June 20

Pole vault
June 19

Long jump
June 21

Triple jump
June 21

Shot put
June 21

Discus throw
June 20

Hammer throw
June 19

Javelin throw
June 19

Heptathlon

References

 (archived)

South American Championships
Events at the South American Championships in Athletics